Barium permanganate is a chemical compound, with the formula Ba(MnO4)2. It forms violet to brown crystals that are sparingly soluble in water.

Preparation
Barium permanganate may be produced by disproportionation of barium manganate in a mildly acidic solution, including solutions carbon dioxide or sulfuric acid: 

3 BaMnO4 + 2 CO2 → Ba(MnO4)2 + 2 BaCO3 + MnO2
3 BaMnO4 + 2 H2SO4 → Ba(MnO4)2 + 2 BaSO4 + MnO2 + 2 H2O

It can also be prepared by oxidation of barium manganate with strong oxidants. Preparations relying on aqueous reactions of barium manganate are extremely slow process due to the low solubility of the manganate.

Another way to synthesize barium permanganate is by the reaction between silver permanganate and barium chloride. Highly pure samples can be obtained from the similar reaction between potassium permanganate and aluminium sulfate to form aluminium permanganate, which is then reacted with a stoichiometric amount of barium hydroxide.

Reactions
Barium permanganate is a strong oxidizer. It is thermally stable up to 180 °C, above which it decomposes in two stages between 180–350 and 500–700 °C.

2 Ba(MnO4)2 → 2 BaMnO3 + 2 MnO2 + 3 O2
4 BaMnO3 → 4 BaO + 2 Mn2O3 + O2

The decomposition has been shown to proceed at slow rates above 160 °C, and that irradiation with UV or X-rays lowers this temperature. Crystal defects and impurities play a role in the mechanism.

Permanganic acid can be prepared by the reaction of dilute sulfuric acid with a solution barium permanganate, the insoluble barium sulfate byproduct being removed by filtering:
Ba(MnO4)2 + H2SO4 → 2 HMnO4 + BaSO4
The sulfuric acid used must be dilute; reactions of permanganates with concentrated sulfuric acid yield the anhydride, manganese heptoxide.

References

Barium compounds
Permanganates